To be included in this list of Italian-American business people, individuals must have a Wikipedia article showing they are Italian-American business people, or must have other published references showing they are Italian-American business people and are notable.

Senior executives 
 Frank Abagnale Jr., founder of Abagnale & Associates, a financial fraud consultancy company.
 Gil Amelio, former CEO of National Semiconductor and Apple
 William Amelio, president and CEO of Lenovo Group Limited
 Mark Attanasio, owner of the Milwaukee Brewers
 Joseph Baratta (1971-), Global Head of Private Equity at Blackstone
 Richard Belluzzo, computer industry executive at HP, SGI, Microsoft, Quantum
 Laurence Boschetto (1954-), senior advisor at The Interpublic Group of Companies
 John Brunetti, CEO of Hialeah Park Race Track
 Debra Cafaro, CEO of Ventas, Inc
 Jim Cantalupo (1943-2004), chairman and CEO of McDonald's
 Michael Capellas, CEO of First Data Corporation
 Chris Capossela (1969-), CMO and Executive Vice President of Consumer Business at Microsoft
 Bob Castellini, owner of the Cincinnati Reds
 Sal DeVito, advertising executive at DeVito/Verdi
 Samuel DiPiazza, CEO of PricewaterhouseCoopers
 Carmine Di Sibio (1963-), Global Chairman and CEO of Ernst & Young
 Nick Donofrio, Executive Vice President of Innovation and Technology at the IBM Corporation
 Joe Gebbia, designer and Internet entrepreneur. He is a co-founder of Airbnb
 Domingo Ghirardelli, Italian-born chocolatier who was the founder of the Ghirardelli Chocolate Company in San Francisco, California.
 Richard Grasso (1946–), former chairman and CEO of the New York Stock Exchange
 Lee Iacocca (1924–2019), former chairman of the Chrysler Corporation
 Paul Montrone (1941-), Chairman and CEO of Fisher Scientific
 Tommy Mottola, Chairman and CEO of Sony Music Entertainment
 Angelo Mozilo, founder and CEO of Countrywide Financial
 Richard Nanula, CFO at Amgen and The Walt Disney Company
 Robert Nardelli, former chairman and CEO of Home Depot and Chrysler
 Frank Nuovo, head of design at Vertu
 Paul Otellini (1950–2017), Intel Corporation's fifth Chief Executive Officer
 Samuel J. Palmisano (1951–), chairman and CEO of IBM
 Frank P. Pellegrino (1901–1975), chairman and CEO of the International Hat Company
 Jerry Perenchio, former Chairman and CEO of Univision
 Joe J. Plumeri, chairman and CEO of Willis Group Holdings
 Roberto Quarta (1949-), chairman of Smith & Nephew and  WPP plc
 Ed Rensi, President and CEO of McDonald's
 Aaron Russo, film producer
 Patricia Russo (1952–), CEO of Lucent Technologies
 Peter F. Secchia, former chairman and CEO of Universal Forest Products
 Joseph Trino, former chairman and CEO of SynQuest Inc
 Barbara Turf (1943–2014), CEO of Crate & Barrel
 Meggan Scavio, President and CEO of the Academy of Interactive Arts & Sciences (AIAS)
 Sonny Vaccaro (1939-), former sports marketing executive

Entrepreneurs 
 Robert Benedetto (1946–), founder of Benedetto Guitars, Inc.
 Steve Bisciotti (1960–), billionaire founder of the Allegis Group, owner of the Baltimore Ravens
 Daniele Bodini (1945–), real estate entrepreneur, San Marino's former Ambassador to the United Nations
 Hector Boyardee, famous for his Chef Boyardee brand of food products
 Richard N. Cabela (1936-2014), co-founder of Cabela's
 Anthony Campagna (1884-1969), real estate developer
 Domenico Canale (1843–1919), founder of D. Canale & Co., major distributor of food and beverages
 Salvatore Capezio (1871–1940), founder of Capezio
 Henry Caruso (1922-2017), founder of Dollar Rent A Car
 Rick Caruso (1959-), founder of Caruso Affiliated
 Pat Croce (1954–), former owner of the Philadelphia 76ers basketball team
 Anthony Casalena, founder and CEO of Squarespace
 Ugo Colombo (1961-), founder of CMC Group
 Rocco B. Commisso (1949-), founder, chairman and CEO of Mediacom
 Carmine D'Addario, co-founder of D'Addario strings
 Nicholas D'Agostino, Sr. (1910–1996), co-founder of D'Agostino Supermarkets
 John D'Angelico (1905–1964), luthier from New York City, noted for his handmade archtop guitars
 Edward J. DeBartolo, Jr. (1946–), billionaire, former owner of the San Francisco 49ers
 John Paul DeJoria (1944–), co-founder of the Paul Mitchell line of hair products and The Patrón Spirits Company
 Remo Belli (1927–2016), jazz drummer who developed and marketed the first successful synthetic drumheads and founded the Remo company.
 Daniel A. D'Aniello (1946–), cofounder and chairman of the Carlyle Group
 Chris Deering (1947–), executive and marketer for Sony PlayStation and other video games
 Fred DeLuca, founder of Subway Sandwich
 Giorgio DeLuca, founder of Dean & DeLuca
 Pat DiCesare (1938-), concert promoter and founder of DiCesare Engler Productions
 Dante DiCicco (1988–), executive and head of international expansion for Snapchat
 Jack Dorsey (1976-), co-founder of Twitter, Inc. and Block, Inc.
 Philip Falcone (1962–), founder of Harbinger Capital and LightSquared
 Vincenzo Ferdinandi, designer among the founders of Italian Haute couture
 Frank Fertitta III, American casino executive and sports promoter, Ultimate Fighting Championship
 Lorenzo Fertitta, American casino executive and sports promoter, Ultimate Fighting Championship
 Tilman Fertitta (1957-), founder, president and CEO of Landry's
 Bill Gallo, founder of Columbia Grain Trading Inc. which he developed into the No. 1 supplier of soybeans to China
 Ernest Gallo, co-founder of the E & J Gallo Winery
 Joe Gebbia (1981–), co-founder of Airbnb
 Domingo Ghirardelli (1817–1894), founder of Ghirardelli Chocolate Company
 Tom Golisano (1941–), billionaire founder of Paychex, former owner of the Buffalo Sabres, three-time candidate for Governor of New York
 Vincent Gruppuso (1940-2007), founder of Kozy Shack Enterprises
 Arthur Edward Imperatore, Sr. (1925–2020), businessman from New Jersey, founder and president of NY Waterway ferry service
 Kenneth Langone (1935–), billionaire founder of The Home Depot
 Lani Lazzari, founder of cosmetics company Simple Sugars
 James Leprino (1937–), chairman of the world's largest manufacturer of mozzarella cheese, Leprino Foods
 Gennaro Lombardi, opened the first US pizzeria in 1905, Lombardi's
 Sam Lucchese (1868-1929), founder of the Lucchese Boot Company
 Joe Mansueto (1956–), founder, majority owner and executive chairman of Morningstar, Inc. and owner of Major League Soccer
 Domingo Marcucci (1827–1905) Venezuelan born shipbuilder and shipowner settled in San Francisco, California
 Giacomo Marini (born 1951), founder of Noventi, a technology venture capital firm, based in Silicon Valley. From 2013 to 2017 he was Chairman and CEO of Neato Robotics, a home robot company until its acquisition by Vorwerk
 Lelio Marino (1935–2004), co-founder of construction company Modern Continental
 Roger Marino, founder of EMC Corporation
 Vincent Marotta, founder of Jarden Corporation
 Robert Mondavi (1913–2008), leading vineyard operator in California's Napa Valley
 Bill Novelli co-founder of Porter Novelli
 Amedeo Obici (1877–1947), founder of the Planters Peanut Company in 1906
 Harry Olivieri (1916-2006), co-founder of the Pat's King of Steaks
 Carl Paladino, founder and chairman of Ellicott Development Co.
 James Pallotta (1958-), founder of the Raptor Group
 Don Panoz (1935–2018), founder of various pharmaceutical companies
 Antonio Pasin (1897–1990), was the founder of the Radio Flyer company in 1917
 Charles V. Paterno (1878-1946),  real estate developer
 Mario Peruzzi (1875–1955), co-founder of Planters Peanut Company in 1906
 Almerindo Portfolio (1877–1966), President of Bank of Sicily (USA), and Treasurer of New York City
 Leandro Rizzuto (1938–2017), chairman and co-founder of Conair Corporation
 Anthony T. Rossi (1900–1993), Italian immigrant who founded Tropicana Products
 Henry Salvatori (1901–1997), Italian immigrant geophysicist, businessman, philanthropist, and political activist who founded Western Geophysical
 Jasper Sanfilippo (1931–2020), Illinois-based businessman, industrialist and philanthropist
 Franco Scalamandré (1898-1988), founder of Scalamandré Inc.
 John A. Sobrato (1939-), founder of the Cupertino, California-based Sobrato Organization, a Silicon Valley development firm specializing in commercial and residential real estate
 Vaccaro brothers, founders of Standard Fruit Company
 Donald Valle(1908–1977), founder and President of Valle's Steak House
 Joey Vento(1939–2011), founder of Geno's Steaks
 Andrew Viterbi (1935–), Italian immigrant founder of Qualcomm
 Mike Volpi, co-founder of Index Ventures
 Pierluigi Zappacosta (1950–), Italian immigrant founder of Logitech
 Marco Zappacosta (1985–), founder of Thumbtack
 Rocco B. Commisso (1949–), billionaire founder of Mediacom and current owner of New York Cosmos and ACF Fiorentina

Finance 
 Robert Agostinelli (1953–), chairman and co-founder of private equity firm Rhône Group
 Ray Dalio (1949-), Founder of Bridgewater Associates
 Mario Gabelli (1942–), stock investor, investment adviser and financial analyst
 Amadeo Giannini (1870–1949), founder of Bank of Italy, which later became Bank of America, the largest bank in the United States
 Luigi Fugazy (1839-1930), banker
 Douglas Leone (1957-),  venture capitalist and former managing partner of Sequoia Capital
 Joseph Perella (1941-), co-founder and CEO of Perella Weinberg Partners
 Frank Quattrone (1955–), investment banker who led dozens of major IPOs during the 1990s tech boom
 Lewis Ranieri (1947–), pioneer of mortgage-backed securities
 Chris Sacca (1975-), Founder of Lowercase Capital
 Vincent Viola (1956–), founder of Virtu Financial, one of the largest providers of financial services, trading products and market making services

Publishing 
  Nick Barrucci, founder, CEO and publisher of Dynamite Entertainment
 Carlo Barsotti (1850-1927), founder of Il Progresso Italo-Americano
 George T. Delacorte, Jr. (1894–1991), founder of Dell Publishing
 Bob Guccione (1930–2010), founder and former publisher of Penthouse Magazine
 Bob Guccione Jr. (1955-), founder the music magazine Spin
 Generoso Pope Jr. (1927-1988), founder of National Enquirer
 Leonard Riggio (1941–), owner of Barnes & Noble
 Louis Rossetto (1949–), founder and former publisher of Wired Magazine

References

External links 
 List of famous Italian-Americans

Business people
Business people
Italian Americans
Italian Americans
Italian American